Mary Sweeney is the name of:
 Mary Sweeney, American film producer
 Mary Ann Sweeney (born 1945) American physicist
 Mary E. Sweeney (1879–1968), American educator, author and clubwoman

See also 
Mary Sweeny, American teacher who smashed windows of a train depot in 1897